Muhammad Zahid may refer to:
Mohammad Zahid (cricketer, born 1966), Pakistani cricketer
Mohammad Zahid (cricketer, born 1976), former Pakistani Test cricketer
Mohammad Zahid (cricketer, born 1982), Pakistani first-class cricketer
Mohammad Zahid (cricketer, born 1985), Pakistani first-class cricketer
Mohamed Zahid Hossain (born 1988), Bangladeshi footballer
Muhammad Zahid Sheikh, Pakistani field hockey player